Events in the year 1855 in Belgium.

Incumbents

 Monarch: Leopold I
 Head of government: Henri de Brouckère (to 30 March); Pierre de Decker (from 30 March)

Events

 21 January – Fire at the Monnaie Theatre.
 30 March – Pierre de Decker succeeds Henri de Brouckère as Prime Minister.
 9 April – Royal Belgian Entomological Society founded.
 12 June – Elections to the Senate
 29 June – Telegraphic convention between Belgium, France and Prussia signed in Berlin.
 Collège Saint-François-Xavier established in Verviers.

Publications
Periodicals
 Almanach royal officiel (Brussels, H. Tarlier)
 Annales de pomologie belge et étrangère, vol. 3.
 Annuaire statistique et historique belge, vol. 2, edited by Auguste Scheler (Brussels, Kiessling-Schnee & Cie.)
 La Belgique Horticole, vol. 5.
 Bulletin de la Commission Centrale de Statistique (Brussels, M. Hayez)
 Collection de précis historiques, vol. 6, edited by Edouard Terwecoren
 Le Guide musical begins publication with Schott frères
 Messager des sciences historiques (Ghent, L. Hebbelynck)
 Pasicrisie ou recueil général de la jurisprudence des cours de France et de Belgique (Brussels, E. Bruylant., 1855)
 Pasinomie: collection complète des lois, décrets, ordonnances, arrêtés et règlements généraux, edited by M. Ranwet (Brussels, Meline, Cans et Cie.)
 Vaderlandsch museum voor Nederduitsche letterkunde, oudheid en geschiedenis begins publication, edited by Constant-Philippe Serrure.

Books
 Hendrik Conscience, The Lion of Flanders, English translation (London, Lambert & co.)
 Hendrik Conscience, Tales of Old Flanders: Count Hugo of Craenhove and Wooden Clara (London, Lambert & co.)
 Walter Scott, France and Belgium (Edinburgh, Adam & Charles Black)
 Jean-Joseph Thonissen, La Belgique sous le règne de Léopold I, vol. 1 (Liège, J.-G. Lardinois)

Art and architecture

Buildings
 Gustave Saintenoy, Quartier Leopold railway station, Brussels

Paintings
 Jean Carolus, Baby's First Steps
 Jean Carolus, The Finishing Touches
 Emile De Cauwer, Church Interior
 Henri Joseph Dillens, The Bird's Nest
 Charles Leickert, Coastal scene with fisherfolk
 Henri Leys, Home-Coming
 Alfred Stevens, The Painter and His Model
 Ildephonse Stocquart, Fleeing the Storm
 François Stroobant, Courtyard of the Palace of Margaret of Austria

Births
 14 March – Émile Wangermée, colonial officer (died 1924)
 16 April – Edouard de Jans, painter (died 1919)
 3 May – Amaat Joos, priest (died 1937)
 9 May – Emilie Claeys, feminist (died 1943)
 10 May – Anthony Bowlby, soldier (died 1929)
 21 May – Émile Verhaeren, poet (died 1916)
 9 July – Jakob Smits, painter (died 1928)
 16 July – Georges Rodenbach, author (died 1898)
 21 August – Auguste Toubeau, trade unionist (died 1912)
 1 September – Eugène Boch, painter (died 1941)
 3 September – Emilius Seghers, bishop of Ghent (died 1927)
 4 September – Théophile Alexis Durand, botanist (died 1912)
 6 October – Alexandre Delcommune, soldier (died 1922)
 22 December – Victor Deguise, general (died 1925)

Deaths
 27 February – Louis Lambillotte (born 1796), Jesuit musicologist
 24 April – Angelus de Baets (born 1793), painter
 13 November – James Oliver Van de Velde (born 1795), bishop
 20 December – Pierre-Ernest Dams (born 1794), politician

References

 
Belgium
Years of the 19th century in Belgium
1850s in Belgium
Belgium